The Black Horse is a Grade II listed public house at 65 Blackhorse Lane in South Mimms, Hertfordshire, England. It can be dated to the early 17th century -as early as 1642- and is of red brick with a tiled roof. It has been kept in its original style, with traditional decor and original bay windows. The building was registered in 1650 alongside the blacksmith building nearby, which can still be seen in disarray among the trees on the north-eastern side. Blackhorse Lane, which may be named after the pub, is the lane along which South Mimms developed. 

Due to its location the Black Horse has been a popular destination to Premier league football players over the years as the training grounds of two London teams are within a short distance. The current owner takes pride in keeping the building in its old style and wishes to preserve it to future generations. The Black Horse is also a popular destination to local population and customers from some distance - for drinks and good quality mostly locally sourced food.  

Aside from the homes along blackhorse lane and nearby village Brookside, the building is surrounded by acres of woodland, neighboring Hatfield House. The surrounding area was and remains rural. It is said that the Black Horse pub is connected to a series of tunnels as far as St Albans. The location is often sought after for productions such as advertisements and shows in need of a traditional english pub.

References

External links
 http://www.blackhorsesouthmymms.co.uk/

Grade II listed pubs in Hertfordshire
South Mimms
Buildings and structures completed in the 18th century